The World Group Play-offs were four tied tennis matches which involved the losing nations of the World Group first round and the winning nations of the World Group II. Nations that won their play-off ties entered the 1996 World Group, while losing nations joined the 1996 World Group II.

Argentina vs. Australia

South Africa vs. Bulgaria

Japan vs. Canada

Netherlands vs. Austria

References

See also
Fed Cup structure

World Group Play-offs